Hocquinghen is a commune in the Pas-de-Calais department in the Hauts-de-France region of France.

Geography
A very small farming village located 13 miles (19 km) south of Calais, on the D215 and D206E crossroads.

Population

Places of interest
 The church of St. Omer, dating from the sixteenth century.
 The nineteenth-century chateau.
 An eighteenth-century presbytery.

See also
Communes of the Pas-de-Calais department

References

Communes of Pas-de-Calais
Artois